Ferrotitanium is a ferroalloy, an alloy of iron and titanium with between 10–20% iron and 45–75% titanium and sometimes a small amount of carbon. It is used in steelmaking as a cleansing agent for iron and steel; the titanium is highly reactive with sulfur, carbon, oxygen, and nitrogen, forming insoluble compounds and sequestering them in slag, and is therefore used for deoxidizing, and sometimes for desulfurization and denitrogenation. In steelmaking, the addition of titanium yields metal with finer grain structure.  Ferrotitanium can be manufactured by mixing titanium sponge and scrap with iron and melting them together in an induction furnace.  Ferrotitanium powder can be also used as a fuel in some pyrotechnic compositions.

References

External links

 TiVolga - ferrotitanium in lumps, fines, cored wire with ferrotitanium filling
 Sumitomo Titanium Corporation - ferrotitaniums QFT-70, QFT-40, QFT-28
 F.E. Mottram Group

Ferroalloys
Deoxidizers
Pyrotechnic fuels
Titanium alloys